Chehel Mani or Chehil Mani may refer to:
 Chehel Mani, Anbarabad, Kerman Province
 Chehel Mani, Qaleh Ganj, Kerman Province
 Chehel Mani, Khuzestan
 Chehel Mani, Sistan and Baluchestan